Woodhall is a small hamlet in Wensleydale, North Yorkshire, England.

Woodhall consists of a garage (Aldersons), three farms and 22 family homes.

References

External links 

Villages in North Yorkshire
Askrigg